Roberto Oscal (born 3 July 1974) is a Guatemalan racewalker. He competed in the men's 20 kilometres walk at the 1996 Summer Olympics.

References

1974 births
Living people
Athletes (track and field) at the 1996 Summer Olympics
Guatemalan male racewalkers
Olympic athletes of Guatemala
Place of birth missing (living people)
Central American Games silver medalists for Guatemala
Central American Games medalists in athletics
20th-century Guatemalan people
21st-century Guatemalan people